Yulin, alternately romanized as Watlam, is one of the fourteen prefecture-level cities of the Guangxi Zhuang Autonomous Region, People's Republic of China. The former romanization follows the pronunciation of the historical name in Yue Chinese. Its built-up area is made of two urban districts, and Beiliu City was home to 2,438,467 inhabitants as of 2020 census.

Geography and climate

Yulin is located in southeastern Guangxi province along the border with Guangdong.

Yulin's climate is subtropical and monsoonal. Average annual temperatures is 22.9 °C. Yearly precipitation is 1,577 mm.

History
Artifacts suggest that the area was settled before the Qin dynasty but a commandery by the name of Yulin was not established until early Han dynasty. The urban centre of Yulin became a zhou in 996 AD. Since ancient times, Yulin has been important for trade and communications between central China and the south, especially along the coast of the Tonkin Gulf.

Administration
Yulin has two districts, one city, four counties, and 119 towns and townships.

Districts:
Yuzhou District
Fumian District

County-level City:
Beiliu City

Counties:
Rong County
Luchuan County
Bobai County
Xingye County

Demographics:
As of the 2020 Chinese census, its total population was 5,796,766 inhabitants and its built-up (or metro) area made of two urban districts and Beiliu City was home to 2,438,467 inhabitants. The majority of Yulin's population is Han but also includes Zhuang, Miao, and other ethnic minorities, totaling more than 100,000 people.

Language and culture
Some Chinese linguists have suggested that the Yulin dialect is the best surviving example of what ancient spoken Chinese would have sounded like based on rhyme patterns in Tang dynasty poetry.

Dog meat festival

Yulin is also known for its annual dog meat festival which takes place on 21 June. Over 10,000 dogs are killed at this festival for human consumption. Reports of inhumane treatment, including torture, caused celebrities and others to protest against the festival.

Economy
Yulin is rich in natural resources. Important mineral resources include granite, limestone, iron, and gemstones. It is also Guangxi's biggest source of porcelain clay. Major agricultural products are rice, bananas, tomatoes, mandarin oranges, mangoes, longan, anise, tea, sugarcane, livestock such as cattle, pigs, geese, chickens and dogs. Industrial goods include machinery, construction materials, processed food, chemicals, pharmaceuticals, cigarettes, and ceramics.

Transportation
Yulin is where the G59 Hohhot–Beihai Expressway and G80 Guangzhou–Kunming Expressway intersect, and there are also provincial highways and "not tolled" roads available.

Yulin is served by Yulin railway station, which sees both high-speed and conventional services. Typical trains take approximately 2 hours to reach Nanning.

Yulin is served by Yulin Fumian Airport, which opened in August 2020.

Education
Yulin is home to Yulin Normal University, where there are 13 departments with 38 four-year undergraduate specialties, 14 three-year specialties, more than 17,200 students including 12,000 full-time students and 5,200 higher education students.

Guangxi Yulin High School is a high-level key middle school in Guangxi Zhuang Autonomous Region and an advanced unit of national spiritual civilization construction. It is also the first demonstration ordinary high school in Guangxi.

Notes

References

External links

The numbers from zero to ten in the Yulin dialect, The Iroha Project

 
Cities in Guangxi
Prefecture-level divisions of Guangxi
National Forest Cities in China